The bocaccio rockfish is a variety of fish found on the western coast of the United States and Canada.

Bocaccio may also refer to:
USS Charr (SS-328), originally designated as Bocaccio

See also

 Giovanni Boccaccio
 Boccaccio (disambiguation)